A by-election was held for the New South Wales Legislative Assembly electorate of Gloucester on 10 November 1917 because Richard Price was expelled from Parliament for abusing parliamentary privilege by making baseless allegations against William Ashford, the Secretary for Lands.

Background

Price made an allegation in Parliament in December 1916 that Ashford acted corruptly in relation to £80,000 spent on a deviation of the railway line between Dubbo and Werris Creek. The following year Price made further allegations against Ashford, including that saw mills were being bought at excess values, salaries were being paid that were not authorised by Parliament and that the government had sold land at £4 per acre and then later resumed it for returned soldiers at a price of £8 5s, an excess cost of £36,000. John Storey, the Leader of the Opposition, stated that he did not take much notice of statements made by Price, but that if the Minister did not take action against Price "the public will have a right to assume that something wrong is going on".

The response of the government was to appoint Montgomerie Hamilton, a Judge of the District Court, to conduct a Royal Commission into Price's allegations. The Royal Commission concluded that "the charges made by Mr Price against Mr Ashford were made wantonly and recklessly, and without any foundation whatsoever".

The report of the Royal Commission was read in the Legislative Assembly and the contents published in Hansard, which then held, by a vote of 46 to 11, that Price was "guilty of conduct unworthy of a member of Parliament and seriously reflecting upon the honor and dignity of this House". The house then resolved, by a vote of 35 to 20, that Price be expelled from the Legislative Assembly.

Being expelled from Parliament however was not a barrier to re-election and Price re-contested the seat. The Labor Party did not nominate a candidate and the Taree Branch of the Labor Party supported Price to embarrass the government.

Dates

Result

Richard Price was expelled from Parliament for abusing parliamentary privilege by making baseless allegations against William Ashford, the Secretary for Lands.

See also
Electoral results for the district of Gloucester
List of New South Wales state by-elections

Notes

References

1917 elections in Australia
New South Wales state by-elections
1910s in New South Wales